Vehicle registration plates of Pakistan are issued by an agency of the provincial or territorial government. Generally, the appearance of plates is frequently chosen to contain symbols, colours, or slogans associated with the issuing jurisdiction. All vehicle registration plates use the Latin alphabet. Every vehicle has a unique registration plate number in Pakistan.

Design
Vehicle registration plate numbers are usually assigned in ascending order, beginning with a starting point such as AAA-001. Thus, someone familiar with the sequence can determine roughly when the vehicle registration plate was issued. The letters I, O and U are not used to avoid confusion with 1, 0 and V. Many provinces distinguish their vehicle registration plates through distinctive colour schemes and logos. For example, the Datura metel flower has appeared on every Punjab plate since 2007. In Sindh, plates have long featured the provincial coat of arms with a distinctive yellow background. Islamabad Capital Territory recently unveiled a new plate with Faisal Mosque in the background. Typically, the registration number is embossed. Other identifying information, such as the name of the issuing jurisdiction and the vehicle class, can be either surface-printed or embossed. The Government of Pakistan fixed the size for all their passenger vehicle registration plates at six inches in height by twelve inches in width, although these figures may vary slightly by jurisdiction. Smaller-sized plates are used for motorcycles, scooters and rickshaws.

Federal plates

Provincial plates
Each province and territory has its own vehicle registration plate design.

Pakistan Governed Kashmir

Balochistan

Gilgit-Baltistan

Islamabad Capital Territory

Khyber Pakhtunkhwa

Punjab

Sindh

See also
 Transport in Pakistan

References

External links

Automotive industry in Pakistan
Road transport in Pakistan
Pakistan transport-related lists
Pakistan
 Registration plates